The Urdu Dictionary Board is an academic and literary institution of Pakistan, administered by National History and Literary Heritage Division the Ministry of Information & Broadcasting. Its objective was to edit and publish a comprehensive dictionary of the Urdu language.

Establishment and objectives 
On June 14, 1958, through a resolution of the then Ministry of Education, the Government of Pakistan announced the creation of an institution named "Urdu Development Board" in order to prepare a comprehensive dictionary of Urdu on the same standards and principles as the Oxford English Dictionary. The Board initially had the following staff members:

 President: Mumtaz Hasan, the former Secretary in the Ministry of Finance as well as the Governor of State Bank of Pakistan; 
 Vice President: Shaista Ikramullah, a former representative at Constituent Assembly and delegate to the United Nations; 
 Honorary Director General: Abdul Haq, a linguist and scholar of Urdu language;
 Honorary Trustee: Abdul Hafeez Kardar, a politician and former professional cricketer;
 Josh Malihabadi, an Urdu poet;
 Hassam-ud-Din Rashidi, a historian and journalist;
 Shan-ul-Haq Haqqee, a linguist and literary critic;
 Abul Lais Siddiqui, an Urdu writer and linguist;
 Syed Abdullah;
 Muhammad Shabbirullah;
 Raziq Al Khairy

On March 27, 1982, the name "Urdu Development Board" was changed to "Urdu Dictionary Board".

Operations 
In 1960, the Board started publishing a quarterly magazine called Urdu Namah under the editorshio of Shan-ul-Haq Haqqee. From then on to 1977, a total of 54 issues were released.

In 1977, the Board published the first edition of Urdu Lughat, a 22-volume comprehensive dictionary of the Urdu language. The dictionary had 20,000 pages, including 220,000 words.

In 2009, Pakistani feminist poet Fahmida Riaz was appointed as the Chief Editor of the Board.

In 2010, the Board publiushedone last edition Urdu Lugha.

In 2016, Aqeel Abbas Jafari has been the Chief Editor of the Board.

In 2017, the digital version of Urdu Lughat was released.

Since 2019, the Board was not assigned another Chief Editor, and 37 out of the total 55 staff seats were vacant due to lack of funding.

References 

Government-owned companies of Pakistan
1958 establishments in Pakistan
Pakistan federal departments and agencies